Asbury Bascom Davidson (November 13, 1855 in Lincoln County, Tennessee – February 4, 1920) served as Lieutenant Governor of Texas from January 15, 1907, to January 21, 1913. He had previously served in the Texas Senate from 1899 to 1907. He was a lawyer who served on the board of directors of what became Texas A&M University. He married Minnie McClanahan in March 1890.

Davidson's 1877 handwritten law license from the State of Texas is held at the Chisholm Trail Heritage Museum in Cuero, Texas. Davidson and wife Minnie Davidson lived at 306 Terrell Street there during much of their life together.

References 
 

Lieutenant Governors of Texas
Texas A&M University people
Democratic Party Texas state senators
People from Lincoln County, Tennessee
1855 births
1920 deaths
People from Cuero, Texas